Castle is an English surname denoting someone who worked at or resided at or near a castle. Notable people with the surname include:

People
 Andrew Castle, British television presenter and former tennis professional
 Barbara Castle, British politician
 Bruce Castle, New Zealand rugby league player
 Charles Castle (1939–2013), South-African-born British tap dancer, television producer, biographer
 Dalton Castle (born 1986), ring name of American professional wrestler Brett Giehl
 Eduard Castle, Austrian-German professor of German studies
 Florence Castle (1867–1959), British artist
 Guy W. S. Castle (1879–1919), United States Navy officer and Medal of Honor recipient
 Irene Castle, American ballroom dancer, wife of Vernon
 Jo Ann Castle, American ragtime pianist
 John Castle, British actor
 John Castle (baseball) (1879–1929), American baseball player
 Keisha Castle-Hughes, New Zealand actress
 Louis Castle, American co-founder of Westwood Studios
 Marlene Castle (born 1944), New Zealand lawn and indoor bowls competitor; wife of Bruce
 Michael Castle, American lawyer and politician, Governor and Congressman from Delaware 
 Nick Castle, film director
 Peggie Castle, American actress
 Peter Castle (born 1987), footballer
 Raelene Castle (born 1970), Australian sports administrator; daughter of Bruce and Marlene
 Roy Castle, English entertainer
 Steve Castle (born 1966), English footballer
 Vernon Castle, ballroom dancer, husband of Irene
 Wendell Castle (1932–2018), American furniture artist
 William Castle, American director, producer and actor
 William B. Castle (1814–1872), American politician 
 William Bosworth Castle (1897–1990), American hematologist, son of William E. Castle
 William E. Castle (1867–1962), eminent early American geneticist
 Frank Castle (rugby league), English sprint athlete, rugby union, and rugby league footballer
 Naomi Castle, Australian water polo player

Fictional characters
 Frank Castle, aka the Punisher, Marvel comics character
 Olivia Castle, character from the film Final Destination 5
 Richard Castle, on the television series Castle

See also
 Castel (surname)
 Castillo (surname)

References

English-language surnames